Sabera dobboe, the yellow-streaked swift or Miskin's swift, is a butterfly of the family Hesperiidae. It is found in Australia in Queensland, Papua New Guinea and Indonesia in the Aru Islands, Papua and the Kei Islands.

The wingspan is about 30 mm.

The larvae feed on Cordyline terminalis, Cordyline australis, Cordyline stricta and Cordyline cannifolia. It lives in a tubular shelter made in a curled leaf of the host plant.

Subspecies
Sabera dobboe dobboe (Papua New Guinea)
Sabera dobboe autoleon (Miskin, 1889) - Miskin's swift (northern Gulf and north-eastern coast of Queensland)
Sabera dobboe hanova Evans, 1949 (northern New Britain and New Ireland on Papua New Guinea)

External links
The Life History of Sabera fuliginosa fuliginosa (Miskin) (Lepidoptera: Hesperiidae) and additional hostplants for the other members of the genus in Northern Queensland
Australian Insects
Australian Faunal Directory

Taractrocerini
Butterflies described in 1883